Southern Afrotemperate Forest (the Southern Cape Forests) is a kind of tall, shady, multilayered indigenous South African forest.
This is the main forest-type in the south-western part of South Africa, naturally extending from the Cape Peninsula in the west, as far as Port Elizabeth in the east. In this range (apart from the massive Knysna-Tsitsikamma forest complex), it usually occurs in small forest pockets, surrounded by fynbos vegetation.

Ecology
This forest ecosystem is a subtype of the general Afromontane forest, which can be found across Africa as far north as Ethiopia. However, it is distinguished from other types of forests in Southern Africa by its relatively distinct range of species and its being confined to the far south-western tip of Africa – separated from the other forested areas to the east and north. Southern Afrotemperate Forest tends to grow on soils derived from sandstone and granite which are the dominant rock formations in the south-western Cape.

The Western Cape is prone to seasonal fires and the various types of fynbos vegetation that dominate here are all governed by the fire cycles. However, Southern Afrotemperate Forest is not adapted to fire, so is always restricted to "fire refugia" such as gorges, wet riverine areas, or rocky scree slopes where fires cannot reach. In the absence of veld fires, the taller forests tend to expand at the expense of the fynbos.

Subdivisions
It is conventionally divided into three closely related subtypes:

Western Cape Talus
This is a type of medium-height scree forest usually only found in small patches, growing on steep, rocky slopes and by mountain streams. It is endemic to the Western Cape. 
Based on location and the species composition of the forests, this type is often informally divided into riverine forests (oewerbos in Afrikaans) and scree forests (dasbos in Afrikaans). The species composition of these two subtypes differs slightly, but they are still similar enough to be classed together as an ecosystem. The dominant, largest, and most obvious tree species are Metrosideros angustifolia, Brabejum stellatifolium, Cassine schinoides, Apodytes dimidiata, Cunonia capensis, Ilex mitis, Kiggelaria africana, Rapanea melanophloeos, Olinia ventosa, and Podocarpus elongatus.

Western Cape Talus forests naturally undergo periodic disturbance, flooding in the case of riverine forests, and rock-slides in the case of scree forests. Swift regeneration immediately follows. The natural cycle of disturbance of the surrounding fynbos vegetation is fire-driven, but this has little effect on the sheltered talus forests.

The main threats to this ecosystem are from invasive alien plants, especially black wattle trees. The natural habitat of Western Cape Talus is usually within catchment areas, and they thus perform an important function in regulating the water-systems and preventing erosion. They are also host to many scenic hiking trails and have value as a source of medicinal plants. In addition, several species (such as Clivia mirabilis and Cryptocarya angustifolia) are endemic to these forests and occur nowhere else in the world.

Western Cape Afrotemperate
The thicker, deeper, denser "South-western Cape forests" are dominated by larger afromontane trees. These tall woodlands are typically found in sheltered gorges and mountainous areas in the Western Cape.

They also include the Cape Peninsula Forests such as those at Newlands Forest, Kirstenbosch, and Orangekloof, which are all located around Table Mountain, within the city of Cape Town.

Typical species include massive trees such as yellowwoods, Ilex mitis, Kiggelaria africana, Assegai trees, ironwoods, Cunonia capensis, Cassine species, Olinia ventosa, and Rapanea melanophloeos, which form the highest canopy; smaller trees such as Halleria lucida, Diospyros whyteana, and Maytenus acuminata, which form a medium layer; as well as a variety of ferns, herbs, bushes, vines, and lianas (e.g. Asparagus scandens, Rhoicissus tomentosa). Though not as rich in biodiversity as the Southern Cape Afrotemperate forests, these woodlands still contain a variety of endemic plants and animals which occur nowhere else in the world.

The major threats come from invasive alien plants such as Australian cheesewood, bugweed, black wattle, lantana, privet, and pine trees. 
Western Cape Afrotemperate forests have a high socioeconomic value, due to their use for recreation such as hiking, their role in preserving the Western Cape's water supply, and their natural production of an enormous range of medicinal plants.

Southern Cape Afrotemperate
By far, the largest portion of Southern Afrotemperate Forest includes the enormous Knysna-Tsitsikamma forests. It extends from Mossel Bay in the Western Cape, eastwards into the Eastern Cape, nearly as far as Port Elizabeth.

This is a tall, dense, species-rich forest in a moist and warm temperate climate. The highest canopy is formed from the intermeshed crowns of the most massive trees. Understories are formed from medium-sized, multitrunked trees and the forest floor is home to a range of indigenous shrubs, bushes, ferns, and flowers. Enormous lianas and vines reach up to the canopy and between the branches and a variety of animals inhabit these woods. 
This forest is very similar to Western Cape Afrotemperate Forest with a very high species overlap; however, it also has some lesser similarities with the Amatole mistbelt forests that lie further to the east in the Drakensberg mountain range.
Previously, large game was abundant, but today it is largely exterminated. A small population of elephants survives at Knysna.

It is often subdivided into three smaller vegetation types: the Southern Cape Mountain forest, Coastal-Platform, and Scarp forests.

Species
Some of the major indigenous tree species:
 Podocarpus falcatus (Outeniqua yellowwood)
 Podocarpus latifolius (real yellowwood)
 Podocarpus elongatus (Breede River Yellowwood)
 Apodytes dimidiata (white pear)
 Brabejum stellatifolium (Cape wild almond)
 Celtis africana (white stinkwood)
 Chionanthus foveolatus (pock ironwood)
 Curtisia dentata (Assegai tree)
 Diospyros whyteana (bladdernut tree)
 Grewia occidentalis (Cross-berry tree)
 Halleria lucida (notsung)
 Ilex mitis (Cape holly)
 Kiggelaria africana (wild peach)
 Maytenus acuminata (silky bark tree)
 Cassine peragua (forest spoonwood)
 Canthium inerme (turkeyberry tree)
 Cunonia capensis (butterspoon tree)
 Ocotea bullata (black stinkwood)
 Olea capensis subsp. macrocarpa (ironwood tree)
 Olinia ventosa (hard pear)
 Nuxia floribunda (forest nuxia)
 Cyathea capensis (forest tree fern)
 Cyathea dregei (common tree fern)
 Pterocelastrus tricuspidatus (candlewood)
 Rapanea melanophloeos (Cape beech)
 Virgilia (blossom tree)

 Gonioma kamassi
 Heeria argentea
 Metrosideros angustifolia
 Platylophus trifoliatus
 Trichocladus crinitus
 Burchellia bubalina
 Oplismenus hirtellus
 Dietes iridioides
 Blechnum capense 
 Lomariocycas tabularis
 Rumohra adiantiformis

 Podocarpus elongatus
 Platycarpos trifoliatus
 Cassine schinoides
 Cryptocarya angustifolia
 Metrosideros angustifolia
 Virgilia oroboides subsp. ferruginea
 Strelitzia alba
 Clivia mirabilis
 Schoenoxiphium album
 Amauropelta knysnaensis
 Polystichum incongruum
 Breutelia elliptica
 Breutelia tabularis
 Distichophyllum mniifolium
 Fissidens fasciculatus
 Macromitrium macropelma
 Ulota ecklonii
 Wardia hygrometrica
 Zygodon leptobolax

Gallery

See also

References

Further reading
 Von Maltitz, G., Mucina, L., Geldenhuys, C.J., Lawes, M., Eeley, H., Adie, H., Vink, D., Fleming, G. & Bailey, C. 2003. Classification system for South African indigenous forests: An objective classification for the Department of Water Affairs and Forestry. Report ENV-P-C 2003-017, Environmentek, CSIR, Pretoria.

Afromontane forests
Tropical and subtropical moist broadleaf forests
Ecoregions of South Africa
Flora of the Cape Provinces
Forests of South Africa
Ecosystems of the Western Cape
Geography of the Western Cape
Montane grasslands and shrublands
Natural history of Cape Town
Trees of South Africa